John "Johnny" Walsh (born 13 June 1946), also known by the nickname of "Waller", is an English World Cup former winning professional rugby league footballer who played in the 1960s and 1970s.

Playing career

International honours
John Walsh won caps for England while at St. Helens in 1975 against France, in the 1975 Rugby League World Cup against Australia, and New Zealand, in 1975 against Papua New Guinea (non-test), and won caps for Great Britain while at St. Helens in 1972 against France (sub), and in the 1972 Rugby League World Cup against Australia, France, New Zealand, and Australia.

Challenge Cup Final appearances
John Walsh played left-, i.e. number 4, in St. Helens' 16–13 victory over Leeds in the 1971–72 Challenge Cup Final during the 1971-72 season at Wembley Stadium, London on Saturday 13 May 1972.

County Cup Final appearances
John Walsh played left-, i.e. number 4, St. Helens' 4–7 defeat by Leigh in the 1970–71 Lancashire County Cup Final during the 1970–71 season at Station Road, Swinton on Saturday 28 November 1970.

BBC2 Floodlit Trophy Final appearances
John Walsh played left-, i.e. number 4, in St. Helens' 5–9 defeat by Leeds in the 1970 BBC2 Floodlit Trophy Final during the 1970-71 season at Headingley Rugby Stadium, Leeds on Tuesday 15 December 1970, and played left-, i.e. number 4, in the 8–2 victory over Rochdale Hornets in the 1971 BBC2 Floodlit Trophy Final during the 1971-72 season at Headingley Rugby Stadium, Leeds on Tuesday 14 December 1971.

Outside rugby league
John Walsh now lives in Canada.

References

External links
Profile at saints.org.uk
When Great Britain won the World Cup
Tracking down the heroes of 1972

1946 births
Living people
England national rugby league team players
English rugby league players
Great Britain national rugby league team players
Rugby league centres
Rugby league fullbacks
Rugby league five-eighths
Rugby league players from St Helens, Merseyside
Rugby league wingers
St Helens R.F.C. players
Western Suburbs Magpies players